Selig Brodetsky, זליג ברודצק (10 February 1888 – 18 May 1954) was a Russian-born English mathematician, a member of the World Zionist Executive, the president of the Board of Deputies of British Jews, and the second president of the Hebrew University of Jerusalem.

Background

Brodetsky was born in Olviopol (now Pervomaisk) in the Kherson Governorate of the Russian Empire (present-day Ukraine), the second of 13 children born to Akiva Brodetsky (the beadle of the local synagogue) and Adel (Prober). As a child, he witnessed the murder of his uncle in a pogrom. In 1894, the family followed Akiva to the East End of London, to where he had migrated a year earlier. Brodetsky attended the Jews' Free School, where he excelled at his studies. He was awarded a scholarship, which enabled him to attend the Central Foundation Boys' School of London and subsequently, in 1905, Trinity College, Cambridge.

In 1908, he completed his studies with highest honours being Senior Wrangler, to the distress of the conservative press, which was forced to recognise that a son of immigrants surpassed all the local students. The Newton scholarship enabled him to study at Leipzig University where he was awarded a doctorate in 1913. His dissertation dealt with the gravitational field.

In 1919, he married Manya Berenblum, whose family had recently emigrated from Belgium, where her father had been a diamond merchant in Antwerp. She bore him two children, Paul and Adele, in 1924 and 1927.

Academic career
In 1914, Brodetsky was appointed a lecturer in applied mathematics at the University of Bristol. During the First World War he was employed as an advisor to the British company developing periscopes for submarines.

In 1919, Brodetsky became a lecturer at the University of Leeds.  Five years later he was appointed professor of applied mathematics at Leeds where he remained until 1948.  Much of his work concerned aeronautics and mechanics of aeroplanes.  He was the head of the mathematics department of the University of Leeds from 1946 to 1948. He was active in the Association of University Teachers, serving as president in 1935–1936.

Brodetsky became the second president of the Hebrew University of Jerusalem in 1949, preceded by Sir Leon Simon, serving until 1952, and followed by Benjamin Mazar (1953 to 1961), at a time when the university was going through a rocky period, eventually having to abandon its campus on Mount Scopus. He attempted to overhaul the structure of the university but he soon became embroiled in bitter struggles with the University Senate, which interfered in his academic and bureaucratic work. Apparently, Brodetsky thought that he was going to take up a position similar to that of Vice-Chancellor of an English university but many in Jerusalem saw the position as essentially an honorary one, like the Chancellor of an English university. This struggle affected his health and in 1952 he decided to resign his post and return to England.

Education
 Jews' Free School (JFS), London (where there is now a Brodetsky House in his honour)
 Central Foundation Boys' School, London
 Trinity College, Cambridge (senior wrangler, 1908)
 Leipzig University (PhD)

Career
 Lecturer in Applied Mathematics, University of Bristol, 1914–1919
 Reader, 1920–1924; Professor, 1924-1948 then Emeritus Professor of Applied Mathematics, University of Leeds
 President of the Hebrew University of Jerusalem and Chairman of its Executive Council, 1949–1951

Other posts
 Member of the Executive, World Zionist Organisation and Jewish Agency for Palestine
 Honorary President, Zionist Federation of Great Britain and Ireland
 Honorary President, Maccabi World Union
 President, Board of Deputies of British Jews (1940–49))

He was a Fellow of the Royal Astronomical Society, Royal Aeronautical Society and Institute of Physics.

His sister Rachel married Rabbi Solomon Mestel; their son is astronomer and astrophysicist Leon Mestel.

References

 
 Who was Who
 Dictionary of National Biography

External links
 The personal papers of Selig Brodetsky are kept at the   Central Zionist Archives in Jerusalem. The notation of the record group is A82.

1888 births
1954 deaths
People from Pervomaisk, Mykolaiv Oblast
People from Yelisavetgradsky Uyezd
Ukrainian Jews
Emigrants from the Russian Empire to the United Kingdom
British people of Ukrainian-Jewish descent
Mathematicians from London
People educated at JFS (school)
People educated at Central Foundation Boys' School
Alumni of Trinity College, Cambridge
Leipzig University alumni
20th-century British mathematicians
British mathematicians
Jewish scientists
Fellows of the Royal Aeronautical Society
Senior Wranglers
British trade union leaders
British expatriates in Israel
Academics of the University of Bristol
Academics of the University of Leeds
Academic staff of the Hebrew University of Jerusalem
British Zionists
Presidents of the Board of Deputies of British Jews
Ukrainian-Jewish emigrants to the United Kingdom
Presidents of universities in Israel